Aïssata Soulama (born 11 February 1979) is a Burkinabé track and field athlete who specialises in the 400 metres hurdles. She also holds the current Burkinabé record 53.81 on 400 metres.

She competed at the 2008 Summer Olympics in Beijing, in the 400 metre hurdles, where she marginally qualified for the second round, being the slowest of the qualifiers with a time of 56.37 seconds.

Competition record

External links 
 
 NBC profile
 
 
 

1979 births
Living people
Burkinabé female hurdlers
Athletes (track and field) at the 2008 Summer Olympics
Olympic athletes of Burkina Faso
African Games silver medalists for Burkina Faso
African Games medalists in athletics (track and field)
Athletes (track and field) at the 2003 All-Africa Games
Athletes (track and field) at the 2007 All-Africa Games
21st-century Burkinabé people